The women's shot put at the 2012 African Championships in Athletics was held at the Stade Charles de Gaulle on 1 July.

The original winner Vivian Chukwuemeka from Nigeria was disqualified, because she was tested positive for a doping substance, stanozolol, on 21 June 2012.

Medalists

Records

Schedule

Results

Final

References

Results

Shot put Women
Shot put at the African Championships in Athletics
2012 in women's athletics